Ejector Seat Reservation is the third studio album by the British alternative rock band Swervedriver, released in 1995. The album includes three untitled hidden tracks which were only available in the United Kingdom.

Critical reception
Trouser Press called Ejector Seat Reservation "one of the most quietly ambitious records" of the 1990s, praising the "more tempered, classic-pop format." MusicHound Rock: The Essential Album Guide called it the band's best album. Billboard called it one "of the more compelling guitar-pop albums of the mid-'90s."

Track listing
 "Single Finger Salute"
 "Bring Me the Head of the Fortune Teller"
 "The Other Jesus"
 "Son of Jaguar 'E'"
 "I Am Superman
 "Bubbling Up"
 "Ejector Seat Reservation"
 "How Does It Feel to Look Like Candy?" 
 "Last Day on Earth" 
 "The Birds"
(unlisted tracks)
<li>"Plan 7 Star Satellite 10"
<li>[unlisted silent track]
<li>"Flaming Heart"

The bonus track, "It's All Happening Now", on the first UK promo was shelved (given away to fan club members) after permission was denied to use lyrics lifted from Bob Dylan's "It's All Over Now, Baby Blue".
Sony BMG reissued the album in 2008 in the UK as a "Remastered and Expanded" edition with four bonus tracks
<li>"Maelstrom"
<li>"Director's Cut of Your Life"
<li>"Just Sometimes"
<li>"Neon Lights Glow"

Personnel
Adam Franklin - guitars and vocals
Jimmy Hartridge - guitars and vocals
Steve George - bass guitar
Jez Hindmarsh - drums

References

1995 albums
Swervedriver albums
Creation Records albums
Albums produced by Alan Moulder